Chandralekha Prabhudas Patel (6 December 1928 – 30 December 2006), commonly known as just Chandralekha, was a dancer and choreographer from India. The niece of Vallabhbhai Patel, India's first deputy Prime Minister, she was an exponent of performances fusing Bharatanatyam with Yoga and martial arts like Kalarippayattu.

She was conferred the highest award of the Sangeet Natak Akademi, India's National Academy for Music, Dance and Drama, the Sangeet Natak Akademi Fellowship in 2004.

Early life and education
She was born to an agnostic doctor father and a devout Hindu mother in Vada, Maharashtra. She spent her childhood in her native Gujarat and in Maharashtra.

Career
After completing high school, Chandralekha studied law, but quit her studies midway to learn dance instead. She started with Dasi Attam, a form of dance practiced by temple dancers in southern India, under the tutelage of Ellappa Pillai. She was also influenced by Balasaraswati and Rukmini Devi Arundale in her dance education, but her choreography shows that she was more influenced by the former. Although Chandralekha received her early training in Bharatanatyam, she went on to change her focus to postmodern fusion dances that incorporated elements from other dances, martial arts like Kalarippayattu, and performing arts.

Awards and recognition
 1991: Sangeet Natak Akademi Award: Creative Dance
 2003-2004: Kalidas Samman
 2004: Sangeet Natak Akademi Fellowship

References

Bibliography 
Rustom Barucha. Chandralekha: Woman, Dance, Resistance. Indus. New Delhi: 1995.

External links
Archive film of Chandralekha performing Yanta in 1994 at Jacob's Pillow

Gujarati people
Indian women choreographers
Indian choreographers
Recipients of the Sangeet Natak Akademi Award
Recipients of the Sangeet Natak Akademi Fellowship
1928 births
2006 deaths
Performers of Indian classical dance
Indian female dancers
Kalarippayattu practitioners
Indian female martial artists
Dancers from Maharashtra
20th-century Indian dancers
20th-century Indian women artists
Women artists from Maharashtra

Experiments in Art and Technology collaborating artists